Gardner was an automobile maker based in St. Louis, Missouri between 1920 and 1931.

Without a dollar in his pocket, Russell E. Gardner left his home state of Tennessee for St. Louis in 1879. Three-and-a-half decades later he was a multi-millionaire. Gardner had made it big in St. Louis by manufacturing Banner buggies before the turn of the century, and unlike many wagon builders, was well aware of what the automobile age meant to his business. He got started by building new Chevrolet bodies and alongside, his company was building wagons. By 1915 this had led to the complete assembly of Chevrolets in St. Louis and Russell Gardner controlled all Chevrolet trade west of the Mississippi River.

Gardner sold his Chevrolet business to General Motors after his three sons entered the Navy during World War I. After the war, his sons decided to build their own automobiles. The Gardner Motor Company was established with Russell E. Gardner, Sr. as chairman of the board, Russell E. Gardner, Jr. as president, and Fred Gardner as vice-president. Their previous experience had been in the assembling of cars, so it was not surprising that the Gardner was assembled from bought-in parts. Lycoming engines were used throughout the years of production. A four-cylinder model with a  wheelbase and medium price was introduced in late 1919 as a 1920 model.

Sales in 1921 were 3800 cars, which increased in 1922 to 9000. In early 1924 Cannon Ball Baker established a new mid-winter transcontinental record from New York to Los Angeles in 4 days, 17 hours, and 8 minutes in a Gardner. They started to prepare to expand the product line and distributorship network. The plant's capacity was 40,000 cars annually, and by 1925 these included both sixes and eights. The fours were dropped in 1925, with both sixes and eights being produced in 1926 and 1927.

For 1927 and 1929 the eights were the only engines used. The interior of the Series 90 cars had many high-quality materials, such as silver-finished hardware, silk window curtains, walnut wood pieces and mohair upholstery (Series 75 and 80 did not have walnut in the interior.)  All cars had a fuel and temperature gauge standard.   During the summer of 1929, Gardner announced two "very important" automobile contracts. The first was with Sears, Roebuck and Company, who wanted Gardner to develop a new car to be sold by mail order. The other was with New Era Motors, to manufacture the front-wheel-drive Ruxton. With the stock market crash in late 1929, both deals were off.

For the 1930 model Gardners, they returned to the six-cylinder engine only. In January 1930 the company announced a front-wheel-drive six-cylinder car, An  six on a  wheelbase with a Baker-Raulang body which sported a longer hood and with distinctive low-slung lines. Rare in America, they used Lockheed hydraulic internal-expanding brakes and two-way hydraulic shock absorbers. Unfortunately, it turned out that they would only produce prototypes of this model.

The 1931 models were the same as the 1930 model, just mildly updated. In mid-1931, Russell E. Gardner, Jr. solicited the permission of his stockholders to stop producing automobiles. The reasons he gave for his company's failure were that Gardner had been unprofitable after 1927 due to fierce competition from the major producers of automobiles and their control of many sources of parts supply. The Gardner funeral car was built through 1932, but then the company ended all production.

References

External links
Gardner Motor Car Company
 

Defunct motor vehicle manufacturers of the United States
Vehicle manufacturing companies established in 1920
Vehicle manufacturing companies disestablished in 1931
1920 establishments in Missouri
1931 disestablishments in Missouri